Peter Chandler may refer to:
 Peter Chandler (soccer) (born 1953), former American soccer player
 Peter Chandler (politician) (born 1965), Australian politician
 Peter Chandler (entomologist), awarded H. H. Bloomer Award

See also
 Peter (disambiguation)
 Chandler (surname)